Matteo Manassero (born 19 April 1993) is an Italian professional golfer who plays on the European Tour. He is the youngest golfer to win a European Tour event.

Amateur career
Manassero was born in Negrar, in the Province of Verona. After a short period at the Villafranca Golf Club, Manassero learned the game at the Gardagolf Country Club in Soiano del Lago following the lessons of the club pro Franco Maestroni. Manassero is currently the touring pro of Gardagolf.

In 2009, at the age of 16, he became the youngest-ever winner of the British Amateur Championship, defeating England's Sam Hutsby in the final. The win qualified him for the 2009 Open Championship, where, playing alongside Tom Watson and Sergio García in the first two rounds, he made the cut and won the Silver Medal as leading amateur. He eventually finished tied for 13th place.

Manassero topped the World Amateur Golf Rankings on 30 December 2009 and remained number 1 for 18 weeks, until he was removed from the rankings upon turning professional.

On 9 April 2010, Manassero beat Bobby Cole's record, which lasted since 1967, to become the youngest player ever to make the cut at the Masters Tournament, at 16 years and 11 months and 22 days. Manassero was nearly two years younger than Cole was when he made the cut at the 1967 Masters. He was surpassed by Guan Tianlang who, on 12 April 2013, became the youngest player to make the cut in PGA Tour history at 14 years, 5 months of age. Manassero announced that he would turn professional shortly after the Masters and about two weeks after his 17th birthday.

Professional career 
Manassero turned pro on 3 May 2010,  making his professional debut at the BMW Italian Open. His first win came on 24 October 2010 at the Castelló Masters Costa Azahar in Valencia, Spain, where he triumphed by four strokes over Ignacio Garrido. The victory made him the youngest-ever winner on the European Tour, surpassing the record set by Danny Lee at the 2009 Johnnie Walker Classic. The victory also secured his full European Tour playing privileges for the next two seasons. Manassero posted another very strong result when he tied for second in the 2010 UBS Hong Kong Open, one stroke behind winner Ian Poulter. He won the Sir Henry Cotton Rookie of the Year in 2010.

In 2011 Manassero secured his second European Tour win at the Maybank Malaysian Open on 17 April 2011 at the age of 17 years and 363 days, making him first and second on the list of youngest European Tour winners.

In 2012 he managed to further improve his results: in November 2012, after a win at the Barclays Singapore Open, he became the first teenager to win three times on the European Tour. He also collected a second place at the Open de Andalucía Costa del Sol, and five more top 10 placements that earned him the 13th place in the final Order of Merit.

In 2013, Manassero won the biggest tournament of his career to date: the 2013 BMW PGA Championship with a birdie at the fourth extra hole of a playoff against Simon Khan and Marc Warren, becoming the youngest-ever winner of this tournament. With the win Manassero gained the right to play in the 2013 U.S. Open and entered the top 30 of the Official World Golf Ranking. He also managed to further improve his final Order of Merit position with an 11th place.

After collecting a 4th place at the 2014 Aberdeen Asset Management Scottish Open as the sole top 10 result of the season, 2015 proved to be a more difficult year for Manassero in the European Tour, where he was able to make only 6 cuts in 22 competitive starts. He finished 167th in the final Order of Merit, but was able to retain his tour membership in virtue of the win at the 2013 BMW PGA Championship.

After the first round of the 2016 Scottish Open, Manassero opened up to bunkered magazine about "deep lows" he had suffered during his period of struggle. He went on to finish T3 at Castle Stuart, his best result on the European Tour all season.

Manassero won his first professional event in seven years at the 2020 Toscana Open on the Alps Tour, two tiers below the European Tour.

Amateur wins
2009 The Amateur Championship

Professional wins (5)

European Tour wins (4)

1Co-sanctioned by the Asian Tour

European Tour playoff record (2–0)

Alps Tour wins (1)

Results in major championships

LA = Low amateur
CUT = missed the half-way cut
"T" = tied

Summary

Most consecutive cuts made – 3 (2009 Open Championship – 2011 U.S. Open)
Longest streak of top-10s – 0

Results in The Players Championship

"T" indicates a tie for a place

Results in World Golf Championships

QF, R16, R32, R64 = Round in which player lost in match play
"T" = tied

Team appearances
Amateur
European Boys' Team Championship (representing Italy): 2007, 2008
Jacques Léglise Trophy (representing Continental Europe): 2007, 2008
European Amateur Team Championship (representing Italy): 2008, 2009
Junior Ryder Cup (representing Europe): 2008

Professional
Royal Trophy (representing Europe): 2011 (winners)
Seve Trophy (representing Continental Europe): 2011, 2013 (winners)
World Cup (representing Italy): 2013, 2016

References

External links

Italian male golfers
European Tour golfers
Olympic golfers of Italy
Golfers at the 2016 Summer Olympics
Sportspeople from the Province of Verona
1993 births
Living people